Lesticus crenicollis is a species of ground beetle in the subfamily Pterostichinae. It was described by L.Schaufuss in 1887.

References

Lesticus
Beetles described in 1887